David McLaughlin is an American college basketball coach.  He is the head coach of the Dartmouth College's men's basketball team.

Coaching career
After a playing career at Colby College, McLaughlin began coaching as a graduate assistant at Suffolk University. He had a tenure as an assistant at Wesleyan University before landing at Stonehill College in 2000. During the 2004 season, McLaughlin assumed the duties of interim head coach, earning the head coaching job for the 2004-05 season. In his first season at the helm, the Skyhawks went 20-8, which led to six 20-win seasons in nine seasons at the helm, along with five NCAA Division II tournament bids, including two Final Four appearances. He finished his Stonehill career with a 189-99 overall record, and 135-80 in Northeast-10 play.

In 2013, McLaughlin joined Bill Coen's staff at Northeastern University, and was part of the staff that won the Huskies' first-ever CAA Tournament title, and first NCAA bid in 24 years.

On April 25, 2016, McLaughlin was named the 28th coach in Dartmouth Big Green history.

Family

Head coaching record

References

External links
 Dartmouth profile

Year of birth missing (living people)
Living people
American men's basketball coaches
American men's basketball players
Basketball coaches from Massachusetts
Basketball players from Massachusetts
Colby Mules men's basketball players
Dartmouth Big Green men's basketball coaches
Northeastern Huskies men's basketball coaches
People from Brockton, Massachusetts
Stonehill Skyhawks men's basketball coaches
Suffolk Rams men's basketball coaches
Wesleyan Cardinals men's basketball coaches